Dendrobium monophyllum, commonly known as the lily-of-the-valley orchid, is an epiphytic or lithophytic orchid in the family Orchidaceae. It has pale green to yellowish pseudobulbs with one or two leaves, and between five and twenty bell-shaped yellow flowers. It grows in rainforest in New South Wales and Queensland, Australia.

Description 
Dendrobium monophyllum is an epiphytic or lithophytic herb that usually forms clumps. Flowering occurs from August to December.

Taxonomy and naming
Dendrobium monophyllum was first formally described in 1859 by Ferdinand von Mueller from a specimen collected near Moreton Bay by William Hill. The description was published in Fragmenta phytographiae Australiae. The specific epithet (monophyllum) is a Latinization of the ancient Greek word , derived from the ancient Greek words  meaning "single" or "alone" and  meaning "leaf".

Distribution and habitat
The lily-of-the-valley orchid grows on trees, rocks and cliffs and on well-lit upper branches of rainforest trees between the Atherton Tableland in Queensland and Grafton in New South Wales.

References

monophyllum
Orchids of Queensland
Orchids of New South Wales
Plants described in 1859
Taxa named by Ferdinand von Mueller